Karnad Sadashiva Rao Road, abbreviated as K S Rao Road, is a popular arterial road in Mangalore, India. It runs from PVS Circle at one end to Hampankatta on the other where it joins Maidan Road near Mangaluru Central Railway Station. This road is named after the indian freedom fighter Karnad Sadashiva Rao.

Many commercial buildings, shopping malls are situated adjacent to this road.

Shopping Malls / Commercial Buildings 
 City Centre Mall
 Excel Mischief Mega Mall
 Hotel Poonja International
 Hotel Sai Palace

See also 
 Mahatma Gandhi Road (Mangalore)
 Pilikula Nisargadhama
 Kadri Park
 Tagore Park
 St. Aloysius Chapel

References 

Roads in Mangalore